Xingangdong is a station on Line 8 of the Guangzhou Metro that became operational on 28June 2003. It is located at the underground of Xingang Road East in the Haizhu District of Guangzhou. The station is close to the Guangzhou International Convention Exhibition Center, the main venue for the Canton Fair.

Before the extension to both lines 2 and 8 opened in September 2010, this station ran as part of Line 2 as a single line from Wanshengwei to Sanyuanli.

Station layout

Exits

References

Railway stations in China opened in 2003
Guangzhou Metro stations in Haizhu District